Hubert Cunliffe-Jones (30 March 1905 – 3 January 1991) was an Australian-born Congregational Church minister and author, who became chairman of the Congregational Union of England and Wales and a professor at the University of Manchester. He was an Honorary Doctor of Divinity from the University of Edinburgh.

Early life
Cunliffe-Jones was born in Strathfield, New South Wales, the son of the Reverend Walter and Maud Cunliffe-Jones. His father was minister of the Strathfield-Homebush Congregational church (now Uniting Church – Korean Parish). He was educated at Newington College (1917–1921) and in his final year was awarded one of three Wigram Allen Scholarships. These were presented by Sir George Wigram Allen following a special examination in March of each year, for classics, mathematics and general proficiency. In 1921, Cunliffe-Jones received the scholarship in classics and William Morrow for general proficiency. He went to the University of Sydney in 1922 and graduated as a Bachelor of Arts in 1925. He then studied theology at Camden College, Glebe, and was ordained. Cunliffe-Jones married Maude Edith Clifton in 1933.

Ministry
 Minister, Warrnambool, Victoria Congregational Church, 1928 to 1929
 Travelling Secretary, Australian Student Christian Movement, 1929–1930
 Minister, Witney, Oxfordshire Congregational Church, 1933 to 1937
 Chairman, Congregational Union of England and Wales, 1957 to 1958

Academic
In 1930, Cunliffe-Jones went to England and read theology at Mansfield, the then Nonconformist college of the University of Oxford. After parish work in Witney he became a tutor in systematic theology at Yorkshire United Independent College, Bradford. In 1947 he became Principal of Yorkshire. Eleven years later, in 1958, Cunliffe-Jones was appointed Associate Principal of the Northern Congregational College in Manchester whilst lecturing at the University of Manchester. In 1966 he was made Professor, History of Doctrine, at Manchester University and from 1968 until 1973 he was Professor of Theology. Following his retirement, Cunliffe-jones was professor emeritus. After his wife Maude died on 28 August 1989 Cunliffe-Jones lived with Margaret, his elder daughter, at her home in Essex. He died in 1991, survived by two daughters and two sons.

Publications
 The Holy Spirit (London: Independent Press) 1943
 The Authority of the Biblical Revelation (London: Clarke) 1945
 --do.--(Boston: Pilgrim Press) 1948
 Deuteronomy: introduction and commentary (London: SCM Press) 1951
 Technology, Community and Church (London: Independent Press) 1961
 Christian Theology since 1600. (London: Duckworth) 1970

References

1905 births
1991 deaths
Australian Congregationalist ministers
People educated at Newington College
20th-century Congregationalist ministers
Clergy from Sydney